Location of Bilozerka settlement hromada in Kherson Raion
The Bilozerka settlement hromada is an amalgamated hromada in Ukraine, in Kherson Raion of Kherson Oblast. The administrative center is Bilozerka.

The area of ​​the hromada is 163.2 square kilometers, and its population is 

It was created on July 6, 2017.

Until 18 July, 2020, the hromada belonged to Bilozerka Raion. The raion was abolished in July 2020 as part of the administrative reform of Ukraine, which reduced the number of raions of Kherson Oblast to five. The area of Bilozerka Raion was merged into Kherson Raion.

References 

2017 establishments in Ukraine
Hromadas of Kherson Oblast